Diana Rafaelevna Kanayeva (born 27 March 1997) is a Russian ice hockey player and member of the Russian national ice hockey team.

She competed with the Olympic Athletes from Russia team in the women's ice hockey tournament at the 2018 Winter Olympics.

References

External links
 
 
 

1997 births
Living people
People from Naberezhnye Chelny
Russian women's ice hockey forwards
Ice hockey players at the 2018 Winter Olympics
Olympic ice hockey players of Russia
Sportspeople from Tatarstan